The Neal Log House (renamed Neill Log House in 1970) is a historic log cabin built in 1765 in Pittsburgh, Pennsylvania.  The Neal Log House is the oldest existing residential structure in Pittsburgh and one of the last few buildings left from the eighteenth century.   The two other buildings - the Old Stone Inn, 1756 (not confirmed) and The Fort Pitt Block House, 1764 are not residential structures. The Pittsburgh History and Landmarks Foundation placed a Historic Landmark Plaque on the building in 1970.  In 1977, it was named a City of Pittsburgh Designated Historic Structure.  It is part of Schenley Park U.S. Historic District
The house was originally called the "Neal Log House" which is the predominant spelling of the family’s name.  However in various documents the last name was spelled Neil and on one document Neill. In 1969 Charles Covert Arensberg wrote a paper entitled "The spelling of Robert Neill who built the Neill Log House in Schenley Park".  It is now known that Arensberg made several erroneous assumptions about the spelling of the last name.  Unfortunately the 1969 paper was used to submit to the city to change the name from "Neal" to "Neill" in spite of the fact the most common spelling of the family’s name was "Neal". [6].

History
The building was constructed around 1765 and it is uncertain if the first occupant of the Neal Log House was a man named Ambrose Newton, a soldier at Fort Pitt, who laid claim to 262 acres in what is now Schenley Park, or if it was Robert Neal for whom the house is named.  It is known as the "Neill (Neal) Log House" after the family who lived in it from about 1765/1770 to 1795 - Robert Neal, his wife Elizabeth (Irwin) Neal, their son John and their five daughters, Nancy; Mary, Elizabeth, Jean and Martha. There was also possibly a second son.  Robert was the son of John and Margaret Neal who emigrated from Ulster Ireland.  On June 8th 1738, John and Margaret Neal purchased 200 acres of land in Paxtang Township, Lancaster County Pennsylvania (now Dauphin County) near Harrisburg Pennsylvania, for “fifteen pounds and ten shillings for each hundred acres” which they called “Neal’s Garden”.  They had 8 children, William, Margaret, Robert, John, James, Jean, Eleanor, and Agnes (Nancy).  William and John Neal were surveyors and farmers who purchased land and developed homesteads in Indiana County Pennsylvania and Westmoreland County Pennsylvania, respectively.  Robert purchased the land in Pittsburgh in what is now Schenley Park developing a wagon trade route along the Nemacolin Indian Trail (Braddock's Road) from Pittsburgh to Philadelphia, with his father’s homestead outside of Harrisburg PA as one of the resting points.    

Records show that Robert Neal bought the house and tract for 34 pounds, 8 shillings. Robert Neal called his tract of land "Highlands." The land was patented to him by the Supreme Executive Council of Pennsylvania. Tax records show he owned the land, two horses, and three cows.  The cabin is likely built on the site because water was available. The property is about four miles from Fort Pitt, where the family could go for protection.  The house appears on a 1790 road survey. It is still on its original site. In 1795, Robert Neal sold the land for 365 pounds, 5 shillings to John Reed, who added an adjoining tract. The profit probably reflects the development of the land by Robert Neal. Reed sold the tract to Brintnal Robins. He, in turn, sold 374 acres to James O'Hara. Col. James O'Hara, left the property to his granddaughter Mary Schenley, who donated the land to the city in 1889.
The land around the Neal house was made into a picnic grove, tennis courts, and not long afterward, a golf course.  An interesting side note is that O'Hara rented the property to the Burchfield family, who owned a lot of property in Squirrel Hill South. Adam Burchfield was born in the Neal house. His grandson, William, married Elizabeth Stewart, Robert Neal's great-great-granddaughter. The Burchfields were executives of Horne's department store for several decades. Robert Neal and his wife Elizabeth (Irwin) Neal, his son John and his wife Jennie (Hamilton) Neal, and several of his daughters and granddaughters are buried in the Allegheny Cemetery in Pittsburgh, Allegheny County, Pennsylvania, USA.  

RESTORATION

In the late 1930s, the house was designated as one of the "most interesting log structures in western Pennsylvania" by Charles M. Stotz when he conducted a survey of historic buildings in this part of the state. When Pittsburgh History & Landmarks Foundation was founded in 1964, one of its early goals was to restore and furnish the Neal house and open it to the public. It was carefully and authentically restored in 1969 by Pittsburgh History & Landmarks Foundation.  The Neal Log House is made of oak logs. The wood was disassembled, and the usable wood kept. All new logs and beams were cut by hand to match the originals. The present roof, floors, and beams are new. The lintel over the fireplace is the original log. The fieldstone foundation, fireplace, and chimney are original. The chimney and fireplace have never been dismantled. The house has a single room with a loft above. According to a 1966 report, the house was well built. The corners were square. The logs were held together by V notches and wooden pegs, the ends of the roof rafters were beveled, and the floor was made of half-logs called puncheons. Nails were not used. Wood pegs simulating the originals hold the rafters together. They are visible in the loft and in the door and window frames. The house originally had a ladder to the loft, which was replaced by stairs in 1969. The chinking between the logs and covering the fireplaces is mortar applied in 1990 to seal out weather. The original chinking would have been clay mixed with hair or some other strengthening material on a backing of stones and twigs. The house is interesting because it has two fireplaces. The larger fireplace was used for cooking, and an unusual smaller fireplace to its left was probably used for heating at night to save firewood. The house is otherwise a typical frontier Pennsylvania log house. The Department of Archaeology of Carnegie Institute under the direction of Kirk Wilson conducted an archaeological dig of the site that turned up 19,000 artifacts, now in the collection of Carnegie Museum.  see: https://carnegiesciencecenter.org/exhibits/miniature-railroad-replicas/

The house currently sits preserved in Schenley Park with a fence around it (though it is open to the public periodically).
The log house is also featured on the cover of A Guidebook To Historic Western Pennsylvania by Helene Smith and George Swetnam.

THE PITTSBURGH BULLETIN

The house was featured in an article on May 8, 1915 in the Pittsburgh Bulletin-
"A log house, once the fortified home of a rugged, full-bearded frontiersman, stands near Indian Springs in Schenley Park, and is now used as a rest house for Pittsburgh business men and stylishly dressed women who seek recreation during the summer months playing golf on the city links.

This cabin was built in 1765 by Robert Neal, of thick hewn logs, the interstices being chinked with flat stones and clay as a protection against the attacks of Indians. It is one of the few pioneer cabins still standing in Western Pennsylvania in which the stone chimney is entirely within the walls and in which the loophole windows, originally about two feet long and less than a foot high, were not enlarged after danger from Indian attack had passed.

This home stood close to Nemacolin’s trail, later known as the “old Road”, which lead from Philadelphia to Fort Pitt. Packhorse trains and heavy wagons bearing supplies from the East passed it on their way to the log village of Pittsburgh. Several times it was besieged by Indians and bloody encounters have occurred about its log walls.

Neal himself owned a wagon trade outfit and with Jack Andrews, a neighbor, made frequent trips to Philadelphia during which he was exposed to constant danger of attack by bands of Indians, for the capture of a heavily laden freight wagon yielded much booty.

One midsummer evening a few years before the beginning of the Revolutionary War, Neal and Andrews had almost reached the cabin on a return trip from Philadelphia without adventure when suddenly just as they were starting down the hill at what is now Murray Avenue and Forbes street an Indian darted out of the bushes and hurled something at the team. The six horses plunged violently down the hill, frantic with fear and pain. The Indian had thrown a wasps’ nest which struck the back of one of the horses and broke, liberating the insects which stung the horses and the driver viciously.

Neal with two “tenderfoot” passengers from Philadelphia who were on the back of the big wagon were not stung but they narrowly escaped being thrown to the ground by the unexpected plunge of the horses, the passengers losing their rifles.

A half dozen Indians followed the runaway horses down the hill, firing as they ran, apparently for the purpose of adding to the fright of the panic-stricken animals. The Indians were disappointed in the evident expectations that the wagon would overturn or be wrecked among the trees and be easy to capture. Although smarting from numerous stings, Andrews kept the plunging horses on the road. By the time they had crossed the bottom of the narrow ravine and started up the steep ascent leading into what is now Schenley Park where the Neal home stands, most of the wasps had been left behind, and the mad speed of the horses slackened during the steep climb.

Furious at the failure of their scheme to cause a wreck, the Indians fired directly at the men on the wagon and wounded both the passengers. Neal returned the fire of the Indians and one of them dropped as if dead. The Indians became more cautious but continued firing from behind trees until they killed one of the horses and brought the wagon to a standstill close to the Neal home.

Neal assisted the two passengers, who were wounded but slightly, into the cabin while Andrews cut the traces of one of the horses and galloped towards Fort Pitt for aid. The wounded men were of no assistance in defending the cabin but the walls were thick and Neal with the aid of his two sons, both under 16 years of age, kept the Indians away from the wagon by firing carefully through the loophole windows. Elizabeth Neal, the wife and mother, reloaded the rifles and kept watch to see that none of the Indians approached from the opposite side of the cabin.

After an hour’s siege the Indians withdrew, evidently fearing the arrival of soldiers from the fort. When Andrews returned with aid, no trace of the Indians could be found.

Neal continued to live in the cabin until 1787 when he sold it to John Reed, another waggoner, for 360 pounds sterling, making a profit of 203 pounds for the property. After changing owners many times the log house came into possession of the Schenley estate and was included in the tract donated to the city for a park. The city restored the cabin to its original appearance except for the roof and gables, and now it is used as a rest house for golf players on the city links."

THE LEWIS AND CLARK EXPEDITION CONNECTION TO THE NEAL LOG HOUSE 

The historic connection between the Neal Log House and Lewis and Clark’s Expedition is believed to have taken place in May of 1803, when Meriwether Lewis traveled to Pittsburgh to launch the keelboat he had constructed up-river from Pittsburgh. Several months later, he began his trip down the Ohio River from the Point, the confluence of the Three Rivers in Pittsburgh and early Gateway to the West. From here, Lewis traveled to the Falls of the Ohio at Clarksville, Indiana, across from Louisville, Kentucky. Soon after, he met up with William Clark.  It is said that “When they shook hands in Clarksville, the Lewis and Clark Expedition began.” More crew members were added and they traveled to winter quarters outside of St. Louis, in final preparation to journey west. This was all after earlier preparation on the rivers of Pittsburgh, where their keelboat was first constructed and launched. May of 1803 was Lewis’ second trip to Pittsburgh, having traveled earlier as a young Virginian volunteer to put-down the Whiskey Rebellion. On both trips, he journeyed from Maryland to Pittsburgh on the ancient Nemacolin Indian Trail, later called Braddock’s Road. There is also evidence that Lewis later traveled with two wagons, by the Neal Log House, on his last 4 miles overland to the Point. Early travelers on the Nemacolin Trail through what is now Schenley Park would water their horses at Snyder’s Springs, source of the historic Catahecassa Fountain at the Neal Log House.   See: https://lewisandclark.travel/nomination/neill-log-home-in-pittsburghs-squirrel-hill/

The Neal Log House is historically important due to the fact that it is one of only a few eighteenth-century structures remaining in Pittsburgh and the oldest existing residential structure in Pittsburgh. Interestingly, of these, three others are in or near Squirrel Hill. They include the Martin log cabin on Overlook Drive in Schenley Park (1769-1774), also built by Ambrose Newton; the Woods house at 4604 Monongahela Avenue in Hazelwood (1790); and the house that was once a stagecoach stop at 423 Kaercher Street in Greenfield (1800).

References

6. https://madeinpgh.com/pittsburgh-arts-culture/10-historic-places-in-pittsburgh/

Houses completed in 1787
Log buildings and structures in Pennsylvania
History of Pittsburgh
Houses in Pittsburgh
Schenley Park
1765 establishments in Pennsylvania